Polish General Staff, formally known as the General Staff of the Polish Armed Forces (Polish: Sztab Generalny Wojska Polskiego) is the highest professional body within the Polish Armed Forces. Organizationally, it is an integral part of the Ministry of National Defence and the Chief of the General Staff is the highest ranking military officer at the Ministry. It was created in 1918, and for a time bore the name Main Staff (Sztab Główny). Currently the position of Chief of the General Staff of the Polish Armed Forces (Szef Sztabu Generalnego Wojska Polskiego) is General Rajmund Andrzejczak, since 2 July 2018.

History and structure
On 25 October 1918, a decision was made to establish the directorate of the chief of staff of the Polish Army. In 1928 the General Headquarters of the Polish Army was established, known commonly at the time as the Main Staff (Sztab Główny). In September 1939, during the Invasion of Poland by the Wehrmacht and the Red Army, all the institutions of the General Staff ceased to function and were transferred to joint German and Soviet. control. On 8 August 1944, the General Command of the Polish Army was created and on 1 January 1945, the National Council of Poland decided to establish the General Staff of the Polish Army, the head of which was appointed Soviet-Polish General Vladislav Korchits.

The General Staff consists of the following command personnel and organizational units at the Ministry of National Defence (MON):

Command personnel (Kadra kierownicza):

 Chief of the General Staff (Szef Sztabu Generalnego WP) - Generał Rajmund T. Andrzejczak
 First Deputy Chief of the General Staff (I Zastępca szefa Sztabu Generalnego WP) - Generał broni (Air Force) Tadeusz Mikutel
 Deputy Chief of Staff (Zastępca szefa Sztabu Generalnego WP) - Generał brygady Dariusz Pluta
 Director of the Chief of the GS's Secretariat (Szef Sekretariatu Szefa SG WP) - Col. Cezary Kiszkowiak
 Director of the Legal Department (Szef Zespołu Prasowego - rzecznik prasowy SG WP) - Col. Joanna Klejszmit
 Director of the Coordination Center (Szef Centrum Koordynacyjnego) - Col. Adam Górecki
 Chief NCO (Starszy podoficer SG WP) -  Starszy chorąży sztabowy Andrzej Woltmann

General Staff Directorates (Zarządy Sztabu Generalnego WP):

Organization and Manpower Complement Directorate (Zarząd Organizacji i Uzupełnień P1) - Colonel
 Intelligence and Reconnaissance Analysis Directorate (Zarząd Analiz Wywiadowczych i Rozpoznawczych P2) - Generał brygady
 Armed Forces Application Planning and Training Directorate (Zarząd Planowania Użycia Sił Zbrojnych i Szkolenia - P3/P7) - Generał brygady
 Logistics Directorate (Zarząd Logistyki - P4) - Colonel
 Armed Forces Development Planning and Programming Directorate (Zarząd Planowania i Programowania Rozwoju Sił Zbrojnych - P5) - Colonel
 Management and Command Directorate (Zarząd Kierowania i Dowodzenia - P6) - Colonel
 Material Planning Directorate (Zarząd Planowania Rzeczowego - P8) - Colonel

List of Chiefs

Kingdom of Poland (1917–1918)

Head of the Inspectorate

Chief of Staff

Second Polish Republic (1918−1939)

Polish government-in-exile (1939−1946)

Republic of Poland / People's Republic of Poland (1945−1989)

Third Polish Republic (1990−present)

See also

 Staff (military)
 General Inspector of the Armed Forces

References

External links
  

1918 establishments in Poland
Military of Poland
Poland